Ismail Khalil Salman (born 13 June 1957) is an Iraqi boxer. He competed at the 1980 Summer Olympics and the 1984 Summer Olympics.

References

1957 births
Living people
Iraqi male boxers
Olympic boxers of Iraq
Boxers at the 1980 Summer Olympics
Boxers at the 1984 Summer Olympics
Place of birth missing (living people)
Asian Games medalists in boxing
Boxers at the 1982 Asian Games
Asian Games silver medalists for Iraq
Medalists at the 1982 Asian Games
Light-heavyweight boxers